Saurien is a 1975,  tall bright red sculpture by Alexander Calder, installed in Manhattan, New York.

The statue is located in front of 590 Madison Avenue at the corner of East 57th Street and Madison Avenue.

See also

 1975 in art
 List of Alexander Calder public works

References

1975 sculptures
Midtown Manhattan
Outdoor sculptures in Manhattan
Sculptures by Alexander Calder